Klagetoh is a census-designated place (CDP) in Apache County, Arizona, United States. The population was 242 at the 2010 census.

History 
Missionaries transcribed “Łeeyi’ tó” as Klagetoh. “Łeeyi’ tó” translates as underground water which is now an abandoned well. It was the first well to be developed and used by the community. The abandoned well is located approximately ⅛ of a mile east of the Red Mesa Store.

The people who pioneered Klagetoh itself are not remembered, at least by name. The Anasazi had a thriving settlement here once, perhaps with almost as many residents as the 6,000-person chapter boasts today.

Rug 
Navajo rugs from the Klagetoh area are among the most popular because of their bold clear cut designs. The Klagetoh weaving is distinguished by strong central design motifs, complex bordering, and a combination of grey, black, white, and red yarns. It is very similar to the Ganado rugs, but with a predominantly gray background instead of the Ganado's red.

Music 
Klagetoh is home to the Klagetoh Maiden Singers and Klagetoh Swingers. The Klagetoh Maiden Singers are Joycetta Bonnie, Rose M. Bonnie, Winnie Bonnie, Marie E. Brown, and Bertha Johnson. The Klagetoh Swingers are Ted B. Bonnie, Ned Tsosie Clark, Frank J. Begay, Robert P. Roan, Arthur P. Roan, Bennie Silversmith, and Johnny Dealison.

Major clans 
Tódich'iinii, Áshįįhí, Tsi'najinii, Tsénjikiinii, Tabaaha, Bitahnnii, Totsonii. Many Klagetoh residents have both Tsin'najinii and Tsenjikiinii in their lineage.

Notable people 
 Annie Dodge Wauneka (1910–1997) – influential member of the Navajo Nation as member of the Navajo Nation Council.
 Albert A. Hale (1950–2021) – attorney and  Democratic politician born in Ganado and raised in Klagetoh.
 Albert Tom – member of the Arizona House of Representatives from 2005 through 2009.

Geography

Climate
According to the Köppen Climate Classification system, Klagetoh has a semi-arid climate, abbreviated "BSk" on climate maps. Temperatures range from an average maximum temperature in the low to mid-90s Fahrenheit (°F) during the summer months (June–August) to an average minimum temperature in the high teens to low 20s during winter months (December–January). Total average annual precipitation in the vicinity of the study area is about 6.5 inches, with the majority typically occurring during July, August, and September. The total average annual snowfall is a little over 5 inches, with the majority typically occurring during December (Western Regional Climate Center [WRCC] 2011).

Education
It is in the Ganado Unified School District, which operates Ganado High School.

Demographics

References

External links
 Kagetoh at CensusViewer

Census-designated places in Apache County, Arizona
Populated places on the Navajo Nation
Arizona placenames of Native American origin